Diletta Carli (born 7 May 1996 in Pietrasanta) is an Italian swimmer. She competed in the 4 × 200 metre freestyle relay event at the 2012 Summer Olympics.

Carli an athlete of the Gruppo Sportivo Fiamme Oro.

References

1996 births
Living people
Italian female swimmers
Olympic swimmers of Italy
Swimmers at the 2012 Summer Olympics
Swimmers at the 2016 Summer Olympics
European Aquatics Championships medalists in swimming
Mediterranean Games gold medalists for Italy
Mediterranean Games bronze medalists for Italy
Swimmers at the 2013 Mediterranean Games
Mediterranean Games medalists in swimming
Swimmers of Fiamme Oro
Italian female freestyle swimmers
20th-century Italian women
21st-century Italian women